BRT ABC is a future bus rapid transit (BRT) system for the southwest Greater São Paulo as a successor of the São Paulo Metro Line 18-Bronze monorail project, cancelled in 2019 by governor João Doria.

Characteristics
The system will have 82 battery electric buses distributed in 3 different lines of same route, but with different services.

History
In May 2021, the construction was announced to begin in September 2021. The first stretch would start operating after the second half of 2022.

On 10 June 2021, desembargador Marrey Uint, from the Court of Justice of São Paulo, suspended, through a temporary lawsuit, the prorogation of Metra's concession alleging, among other reasons, that the period would be beyond the allowed limit (total of 35 years) and the extra permission to operate the 85 lines of intermunicipal buses of the Greater ABC and the construction of the system wouldn't exempt company contract through a bidding process.

References

Bus rapid transit